Andrew Baxter Leven  (2 February 1885 – 1966) was a Scottish-born architect in Australia. As chief architect in the Queensland Department of Public Works, he designed many of Queensland's public buildings, some of which are now heritage-listed.

Early life 
Leven was born in Montrose, Angus in 1885. Leven trained as an architect in Scotland and then immigrated to Queensland in 1910 on the recommendation of friends.

Architectural career 
He became chief architect of the Queensland Department of Public Works (Queensland Government Architect) in 1927.

He was a Fellow of the Royal Australian Institute of Architects and chairman of the Board of Architects of Queensland and a member of the Architecture Faculty of the University of Queensland.

Person life 
Leven married Ethel Maud Richardson in 1919. They had one son and one daughter. He retired in February 1951 and died in 1966 in Brisbane.

Notable works
 ANZAC Square, Brisbane
 Brisbane Dental Hospital and College
 Mackay Court House
 University of Queensland Mayne Medical School

References

Architects from Brisbane
Academic staff of the University of Queensland
1885 births
1966 deaths
People from Montrose, Angus
Date of death missing
Scottish emigrants to Australia